A power nap or cat nap is a short sleep that terminates before deep sleep (slow-wave sleep; SWS).  A power nap is intended to quickly revitalize the sleeper.

Cornell University social psychologist James Maas coined the term.  A power nap combined with consuming caffeine is called a stimulant nap, coffee nap, caffeine nap, or nappuccino.

Characteristics
A power nap, also known as a Stage 2 nap, is a short slumber of 20 minutes or less which terminates before the occurrence of deep slow-wave sleep, intended to quickly revitalize the napper. The expression "power nap" was coined by Cornell University social psychologist James Maas.

The 20-minute nap increases alertness and motor skills. Various durations may be recommended for power naps, which are short compared to regular sleep. The short duration prevents nappers from sleeping so long that they enter the slow wave portion of the normal sleep cycle without being able to complete the cycle. Entering deep, slow-wave sleep and failing to complete the normal sleep cycle, can result in a phenomenon known as sleep inertia, where one feels groggy, disoriented, and even sleepier than before beginning the nap. In order to attain optimal post-nap performance, a Stage 2 nap must be limited to the beginning of a sleep cycle, specifically sleep stages N1 and N2, typically 18–25 minutes.

Experimental confirmation of the benefits of this brief nap comes from a Flinders University study in Australia in which 5, 10, 20, or 30-minute periods of sleep were given. The greatest immediate improvement in measures of alertness and cognitive performance came after the 10 minutes of sleep. The 20 and 30-minute periods of sleep showed evidence of sleep inertia immediately after the naps and improvements in alertness more than 30 minutes later, but not to a greater level than after the 10 minutes of sleep. Power naps are effective even when schedules allow a full night's sleep.

Various durations are recommended for power naps, which are very short compared to regular sleep. The short duration of a power nap is designed to prevent nappers from entering SWS. Depending on duration and intensity, awakenings out of SWS results in sleep inertia, a phenomenon associated with grogginess, disorientation, and even more fatigue than prior to napping. Since sleep is the most effective and beneficial recovery method from fatigue, experts recommend considering duration vs. risk of entering SWS.

Research

Potential benefits
Power naps intend to restore alertness, performance, and learning ability. A nap may also reverse the hormonal impact of a night of poor sleep or reverse the damage of sleep deprivation. A University of Düsseldorf study found superior memory recall once a person had reached 6 minutes of sleep, suggesting that the onset of sleep may initiate active memory processes of consolidation which—once triggered—remains effective even if sleep is terminated.

According to clinical studies among men and women, power nappers of any frequency or duration had a significantly lower mortality ratio due to heart disease than those not napping. Specifically, those occasionally napping had a 12% lower coronary mortality, whereas those systematically napping had a 37% lower coronary mortality.

A Flinders University study of individuals restricted to only five hours of sleep per night found a 10-minute nap was overall the most recuperative nap duration of various nap lengths they examined (lengths of 0 min, 5 min, 10 min, 20 min, and 30 minutes): the 5-minute nap produced few benefits in comparison with the no-nap control; the 10-minute nap produced immediate improvements in all outcome measures (including sleep onset latency, subjective sleepiness, fatigue, vigor, and cognitive performance), with some of these benefits maintained for as long as 155 minutes; the 20-minute nap was associated with improvements emerging 35 minutes after napping and lasting up to 125 minutes after napping; and the 30-minute nap produced a period of impaired alertness and performance immediately after napping, indicative of sleep inertia, followed by improvements lasting up to 155 minutes after the nap.

The NASA Ames Fatigue Countermeasures Group studied the effects of sleep loss and jet lag, and conducts training to counter these effects. A major fatigue countermeasures recommendation consists of a 40-minute nap ("NASA nap") which empirically showed to improve flight crew performance and alertness with a 22% statistical risk of entering SWS.

For several years, scientists have been investigating the benefits of napping, both the power nap and much longer sleep durations as long as 1–2 hours. Performance across a wide range of cognitive processes has been tested. Studies demonstrate that naps are as good as a night of sleep for some types of memory tasks.

A NASA study led by David F. Dinges, professor at the University of Pennsylvania School of Medicine, found that naps can improve certain memory functions. In that NASA study, volunteers spent several days living on one of 18 different sleep schedules, all in a laboratory setting. To measure the effectiveness of the naps, tests probing memory, alertness, response time, and other cognitive skills were used.

Power Napping Enablers and sleep timers allow properly timed power napping.

One study showed that a midday snooze reverses information overload. Reporting in Nature Neuroscience, Sara Mednick, PhD, Stickgold and colleagues also demonstrated that "burnout" irritation, frustration and poorer performance on a mental task can set in as a day of training wears on. This study also proved that, in some cases, napping could even boost performance to an individual's top levels. The NIMH team wrote: "The bottom line is: we should stop feeling guilty about taking that 'power nap' at work."

Potential risks and detriments

Longer and more frequent daytime naps appeared to be associated with a higher risk of Alzheimer's dementia in a study that tracked 1401 older people over 14 years.

Stimulant nap

A stimulant nap is a brief period of sleep of around 15 minutes, preceded by consuming a caffeinated drink or another stimulant.

It may combat daytime drowsiness more effectively than napping or drinking coffee alone. A stimulant nap is more effective than regular naps in improving post-nap alertness and cognitive functioning. In a driving simulator and a series of studies, Horne and Reyner investigated the effects of cold air, radio, a break with no nap, a nap, caffeine pill vs. placebo and a short nap preceded by caffeine on mildly sleep-deprived subjects. A nap with caffeine was by far the most effective in reducing driving accidents and subjective sleepiness as it helps the body get rid of the sleep-inducing chemical compound adenosine. Caffeine in coffee takes up to half an hour to have an alerting effect, hence "a short (<15min) nap will not be compromised if it is taken immediately after the coffee." One account suggested that it was like a "double shot of energy" from the stimulating boost from caffeine plus better alertness from napping. This procedure has been studied on sleep-deprived humans given the task of driving a motor vehicle afterwards, although it has not been studied on elderly populations.

Nap rooms and tech aided naps

Some companies have nap rooms to allow employees to take power naps. This may be in a form of a nap room with a recliner, or chairs specially designed for power napping installed in a designated area. Companies with nap rooms say that employees are happier and become more productive at work.

Similar nap rooms and stations also exist in higher education institutions. Many colleges and universities provide napping furnitures such as cots and giant bean bags in libraries for students to take naps after long periods of study. At least one university has a nap room set up in a gym. Some medical schools also set up nap rooms at teaching hospitals. The nap rooms may include sleeping pods or cots, white noise machines, and antimicrobial pillows.

In Barcelona, there is a café called Nappuccino that implements custom-built napping pods inside the café.

A more portable aid is a nap timer app. Apps have various features including aided sounds, nap history and pattern tracking and daily reminders that make it easier to take naps.

See also
 Siesta
 Nap
 Sleeping while on duty

References

Further reading 
 Maas, James. Power Sleep : The Revolutionary Program That Prepares Your Mind for Peak Performance; William Morrow Paperbacks; 1st edition,  19 December 1998; .

External links
 Boston Globe article on power naps
 University of Miami : "Sleep, Napping and the Brain -The Power of Napping", YouTube

Sleep

sv:Sömn#Tupplur